is a 1976 Japanese film directed by Yasuzo Masumura.

Plot

The story of an orphan girl, brought up in naive, rustic innocence by an elderly relative, who is suddenly exposed to the brutality, greed and deceptiveness of the outside world when her grandmother dies. Notwithstanding her healthy distrust of all strangers, which her upbringing instilled in her, it is not long before a cunning racketeer finds her weak point, that temptation which she cannot resist, that weakness, different as it may be, that each of us has, and brings her into his power. What follows is a depiction of her cruel descent into the depths of moral decay, as she becomes a collaborator in a system of exploitation, unbridled lust, vanity, and greed, in which she and other victims are always the losers.

Cast
 Mieko Harada - Rin
 Eiji Okada
 Meiko Kaji
 Kinuyo Tanaka

Awards and nominations
19th Blue Ribbon Awards
 Won: Best Film
 Won: Best Newcomer - Mieko Harada

Reception 
The Japanese filmmaker Akira Kurosawa cited Lullaby of the Earth as one of his 100 favorite films.

References

External links 

1976 films
Films directed by Yasuzo Masumura
1970s Japanese-language films
1970s Japanese films